The Rebel Award is a lifetime achievement award for a science fiction fan "who has done a great deal for Southern Fandom." The Rebel is given annually by DeepSouthCon, a bidded convention held in different states of the former Confederacy.

There is no standard shape or image for the Rebel as each host convention creates their own unique interpretation of the award. The Rebel is presented in conjunction with Phoenix Award for a science fiction professional (author, artist, editor, etc.) meeting similar criteria. The award recipients are chosen by the host convention.

List of Rebel Award winners

 2021: Cheralyn Lambeth
 2020: Raymond Boudreau & Jessica Styons & Rebecca Smith
 2019: Ron McClung & Jeff Smith
 2018: Rick Norwood
 2017: Bob Ellis & Mike Pederson
 2016: Pat Henry & Bill Harrison
 2015: Michael Scott & Frank Schiavo
 2014: Judy Bemis
 2013: Regina Kirby & M. Lee Rogers
 2012: Shelby Vick, Bill Zielke, Linda Zielke, Robert Zielke, & Becky Zielke
 2011: Brad W. Foster
 2010: Albin Johnson
 2009: Randy Cleary
 2008: Kelly Lockhart
 2007: Bill Payne, "Dutch" Stacy, & Mickey Kilgore
 2006: Dan Caldwell
 2005: Naomi Fisher
 2004: Dal Coger† & Sue Thorn
 2003: Mike Kennedy
 2002: Julie Wall
 2001: Robert Neagle & Sam Smith
 2000: Lynn Harris & Toni Weisskopf
 1999: Tim "Uncle Timmy" Bolgeo
 1998: Tom Feller & Wilson "Bob" Tucker
 1997: Teddy Harvia
 1996: Gary Robe & Corlis Robe
 1995: J.R. "Mad Dog" Madden
 1994: Don Cook & Bob Shaw
 1993: G. Patrick Molloy
 1992: Steve Francis & Sue Francis
 1991: Samanda B. Jeude
 1990: Charlotte Proctor
 1989: Steven Carlberg & Maurine Dorris
 1988: Sue Phillips & mike weber 
 1987: Lee Hoffman & Penny Frierson
 1986: John A.R. Hollis
 1985: Larry Montgomery & P.L. Caruthers-Montgomery
 1984: Guy H. Lillian III
 1983: John Guidry & Lynn Hickman
 1982: Lon Atkins
 1981: Dick Lynch & Nicki Lynch
 1980: Jerry Page
 1979: Cliff Amos
 1978: Don Markstein
 1977: Cliff Biggers & Susan Biggers
 1976: Ned Brooks
 1975: Meade Frierson III
 1974: Ken Moore
 1973: Hank Reinhardt
 1972: No Award Given
 1971: Janie Lamb
 1970: Irvin Koch
 1969: No Award Given
 1968: No Award Given
 1967: No Award Given
 1966: David Hulan
 1965: Al Andrews

† = award presented posthumously

References

External links

Regional and local science fiction awards